The 1966–67 Japan Ice Hockey League season was the first season of the Japan Ice Hockey League. Five teams participated in the league, and Iwakura Ice Hockey Club won the championship.

Regular season

External links
 Japan Ice Hockey Federation

Japan
Ice hockey
Ice hockey
Japan Ice Hockey League seasons
Japan